Joseph Franklyn Carter (born 17 December 1992) is a New Zealand cricketer who plays for Northern Districts. He made his Twenty20 debut for Northern Districts on 4 December 2016 in the 2016–17 Super Smash. Prior to his Twenty20 debut, he was part of New Zealand's squad for the 2012 Under-19 Cricket World Cup.

On 7 November 2018, in the fifth round fixture of the 2018–19 Ford Trophy between Northern Districts and Central Districts, he and Brett Hampton set a new record in List A cricket for the most runs scored off one over, with 43. The over was bowled by Willem Ludick and included two no-balls, six sixes, a four and a single.

In March 2020, in round five of the 2019–20 Plunket Shield season, Carter and Mark Chapman scored centuries in both innings of the match. It was the first time that two batsman had scored a century in each innings in the same match in the Plunket Shield. In November 2020, Carter was named in the New Zealand A cricket team for practice matches against the touring West Indies team.

References

External links
 

1992 births
Living people
New Zealand cricketers
Northern Districts cricketers
Sportspeople from Hemel Hempstead
English emigrants to New Zealand